Immortan Joe is a fictional character and the main antagonist of the 2015 film Mad Max: Fury Road. He is portrayed by Hugh Keays-Byrne. Immortan Joe also appears in the 2015 prequel comic series of the same name, and will return in the 2024 prequel film Furiosa as a supporting protagonist, portrayed by Chris Hemsworth.

Character description
In the film, Immortan Joe is the "ruler of the wasteland... He wears a clear, plastic carapace — chest armor — over oozing sores, his long, white hair flaring around a skeleton-smile mask he uses to hide a breathing apparatus." Several versions of his carapace, which display medals made from car and mobile phone parts and some actual military insignia (such as the U.S. Navy officer cap insignia), were created at Artisan Armours in the United Kingdom.

Immortan Joe's third son, Scabrous Scrotus, was introduced in a spin-off video game, Mad Max.

Reception
Writing about the film for ABC News, Michael Rothman described Immortan Joe as "a real bad guy who looks nothing like any villain that's ever graced the silver screen". Vanity Fair Joanna Robinson described him as "nightmarish" and "a fairly classic Miller creation with a skull fetish even a teenage goth would envy". Spencer Kornhaber of The Atlantic wrote, "Perhaps the closest 2015 has gotten to providing fodder for 'Greatest Villains of All Time' lists was in Mad Max: Fury Road, where slaver-warlord Immortan Joe sported a nauseating headpiece and an equally nauseating dadbod."

See also
 MTV Movie Award for Best Villain

References

Action film villains
Fictional characters with disfigurements
Fictional dictators
Fictional slave owners
Film characters introduced in 2015
Mad Max (franchise) characters
Male film villains
Film supervillains